James Francis Dunn (1874–1921) was an American architect who designed many buildings in San Francisco, California.

References

1874 births
1921 deaths
Architects from San Francisco